John Cunningham Cleland (born 15 July 1952) is a retired Scottish auto racing driver, best known for winning the British Touring Car Championship in 1989 and 1995.

Born in Wishaw, Cleland raced autocross and hillclimb in the 1970s, and won his class in the Scottish Rally Championship in 1976 driving a Mitsubishi Colt. He switched to circuit racing, achieving success in British Production Car and Thundersaloon championships in the 1980s, before joining Vauxhall for the 1989 British Touring Car Championship. He was most recently a co-commentator alongside Martin Haven on the English world feed of the World Touring Car Championship.

Racing career

Pre-BTCC
In the mid-1980s, Cleland's father Bill purchased the 1984 Bathurst 1000 2nd place Holden VK Commodore (an Australian car) from Peter Brock's Holden Dealer Team for his son to race in Thundersaloons. During this time the Commodore ran as a Vauxhall Senator.

BTCC
Cleland adapted quickly to touring car racing and won the BTCC at his first attempt, in the days when the championship consisted of four separate classes, each in their own races but scoring points for the same title. Cleland won 11 of his 13 races in class C for 1.5l cars. The 2-litre Cavalier was introduced the next year, in readiness for the single 2-litre format in 1991. Cleland finished 2nd in class to his rival Frank Sytner in 1990 after a fierce season long battle, and 5th overall. The following year he won three races and finished second in the championship to Will Hoy, taking Vauxhall's first ever overall BTCC win. In 1992 Cleland battled with Hoy and Tim Harvey for the title, but was denied at the last round by a controversial collision with Steve Soper, the teammate of eventual champion Harvey. In 1993 and 1994 the championship was dominated by BMW and Alfa Romeo respectively, and Cleland had to make do with fourth overall in both years.

1995 proved to be the breakthrough year for the Cavalier, ironically in its last year of competition. Despite the Volvo 850 and Renault Laguna often having the edge in speed, in the hands of Rickard Rydell and Alain Menu respectively, Cleland's consistent run of points finishes allied to a four-race winning streak in the mid-season allowed him to beat both drivers to the title.

For 1996, the Cavalier was replaced by the new Vectra, which turned out to be a problematic package. Cleland finished 8th in the title chase. 1997 proved to be even worse, with Cleland slipping to 12th in the standings and Vauxhall finishing bottom of the Constructors' title. 1998 was better, and Cleland took two victories, both at Donington Park - a traditional happy hunting ground for the Scotsman - before a heavy crash at Snetterton interrupted his season. In 1999 Cleland was outpaced by team newcomer Yvan Muller and decided by mid-season to retire. He finished his last race at a wet Silverstone in tenth place, after being given a drive-through penalty for speeding in the pits, which provoked a typically belligerent reaction from Cleland over a live radio link to his car that had been set up by the BBC.

In a 2005 poll by Motorsport Magazine, Cleland was voted the 10th greatest touring car driver of all time.

Post BTCC
Aside running his long running car dealership, he has done several guest drives since retiring from the BTCC, including a season in a Dodge Viper in the British GT Championship in 2000, co driving with Dave Clark for the CSi Brookspeed team. He later drove in an ASCAR race at Rockingham, twelve Bathurst 1000s between 1993 and 2005 for Advantage Racing, Pinnacle Motorsport, Gibson Motorsport, Triple Eight, Greenfield Mowers Racing and Brad Jones Racing with a best finish of 2nd in the 2001 event, co driving with Brad Jones, and the BTCC Masters race in 2004. He now runs a Volvo dealership in Galashiels Scotland. His son Jamie has started a racing career. Cleland is also a co-commentator for Eurosport on their WTCC coverage. He replaced fellow Scot David Leslie after his death in 2008.

Cleland purchased his old Vauxhall Vectra super tourer, and now races in the Historic Super Touring championship, alongside his contemporaries Patrick Watts and Tim Harvey.

Racing record

Complete European Touring Car Championship results

(key) (Races in bold indicate pole position) (Races in italics indicate fastest lap)

Complete British Touring Car Championship results
(key) Races in bold indicate pole position (1 point awarded all races 1996 onwards, 1989–1990 in class) Races in italics indicate fastest lap (1 point awarded all races - 1989–1990 in class) * signifies that driver lead feature race for at least one lap (1 point awarded - 1998 onwards)

 – Race was stopped due to heavy rain. No points were awarded.

Complete V8 Supercar Championship results

Complete Bathurst 1000 results

* Super Touring race

Complete British GT Championship results
(key) (Races in bold indicate pole position) (Races in italics indicate fastest lap)

References

External links

Profile at BTCCPages
Official site
BRDC Archive profile
Clelands of the Borders car dealership

Scottish racing drivers
British hillclimb drivers
1952 births
British Touring Car Championship drivers
British Touring Car Championship Champions
Supercars Championship drivers
Living people
Sportspeople from Wishaw
ASCAR drivers
Porsche Carrera Cup GB drivers